William John Vancise (June 19, 1872 – 1935) was a farmer and political figure in Saskatchewan. He represented Lumsden in the Legislative Assembly of Saskatchewan from 1917 to 1925 as a Liberal.

He was born in McIntyre, Ontario, the son of Albert Vancise and Anne McKinnon. In 1901, Vancise married Jennie Campbell. He lived in Grand Coulee, Saskatchewan.

References 

Saskatchewan Liberal Party MLAs
1872 births
1935 deaths
Canadian farmers